Patty Harrison (born 1935) and Robin Tyler (born April 8, 1942) were a feminist comedy duo, noted as the first lesbian, feminist comedy act. They came together during the 1970s, performing in small venues like colleges and using comedy as a tool to make fun of a system that oppresses lesbians, women, and members of the LGBT community. They soon moved to even bigger opportunities with the American Broadcasting Company signing Harrison and Tyler to create a variety show. Unfortunately, they did not get picked up. The duo then began to make appearances on the Krofft Comedy Hour and at many feminist and gay rights demonstrations. During one demonstration, they asked for more athletic scholarships for women after running onto the field at a Raiders versus Rams football game. In 1972, Harrison and Tyler produced Maxine Feldman’s “Angry Atthis” and began to produce their own comedy albums, Try It, You'll Like It (1972) and Wonder Women (1973). Tyler and Harrison broke up as a comedy act, though not as a couple, in 1978. Robin Tyler went on to become the first out lesbian comic and a prominent leader in the movement for marriage equality and LGBTQIA+ rights.

Works 

 Try It, You'll Like It (1972)
 Wonder Women (1973).

References 

American comedy duos
American stand-up comedians
American feminists
Feminist comedians
Lesbian feminists
Lesbian comedians
Living people
1935 births
1942 births
Place of birth missing (living people)